These are the singles that reached number one on the Top 100 Singles chart in 1989 as published by Cash Box magazine.

See also
1989 in music
List of Hot 100 number-one singles of 1989 (U.S.)

References
https://web.archive.org/web/20110818051437/http://cashboxmagazine.com/archives/80s_files/1989.html

1989
1989 record charts
1989 in American music